The Jackson County Sheriff's Office is a law enforcement agency located in Jackson County, Mississippi, which is responsible of providing law enforcement services to areas of the county that are unincorporated communities which do not have their own local police force.  With over 200 officers, it is the largest law enforcement agency in Jackson County.

The current sheriff for the Jackson County Sheriff's Office is John Ledbetter (Acting). 

The county's largest city in population is Pascagoula, Mississippi.

History
In 2000, Deputy Sheriff Bruce Wayne Evans was killed while on duty.  The cause of death was "vehicular assault", and the assailant received a life sentence.

Organization 
 
The Jackson County Sheriff's Office provides law enforcement services to the unincorporated communities in Jackson County, Mississippi.

These communities are:
Big Point
Escatawpa
Gulf Hills
Gulf Park Estates
Helena
Hickory Hills
Hurley
Latimer
St. Martin
Vancleave
Wade

Substations
 Main Station, Pascagoula
 Ocean Springs Substation, St. Martin
 Hurley Substation, Hurley, Escatawpa
 Vancleave Substation, Vancleave

See also

 List of law enforcement agencies in Mississippi

References

External links
 Jackson County Sheriff's site

Jackson County
Jackson County, Mississippi